Lebanese expatriates that work in the United Arab Emirates are involved in business and the media as beauty surgeons, businessmen, artists, presenters and news anchors. Over 15,000 Lebanese companies operate in the Jebel Ali Free Zone, an economic hub located in Jebel Ali, a city in Dubai.

Notable Lebanese people in the UAE include:
Cyba Audi: Entrepreneur and communication expert.
Antoine Choueiri: owner of the Middle East’s largest media broker (Choueiri Group) that controls Arabian Media Services International, MEMS, Arabian Outdoor, Times International, Audio Visual Media, C Media, Press Media, Digital Media Services, Interadio, Promofair, AMC and SECOMM.
Ralph Debbas: Automotive designer, founder and part-owner of W Motors.
Diana Haddad: Lebanese singer (holding the Emirati citizenship) and former wife of the Emirati director, Suhail Al Abdool.
Jessica Kahawaty: Miss World Australia 2012
Taleb Kanaan: Al Arabiya presenter.
Rima Maktabi: Al Arabiya news presenter and former presenter of Inside the Middle East on CNN International.
Elias Bou Saab: the Founder of the American University in Dubai (AUD).
Iskandar Safa: Owner of Privinvest, the major defence contractor in Europe controlling shipyards and facilities.
Najwa Qassem: Al Arabiya presenter.

See also
List of Lebanese people
List of Lebanese people (Diaspora)
Lebanese people in the United Arab Emirates

References

United Arab Emirates
Lists of Emirati people
Lebanese